Thomas Murray may refer to:

Politicians
Thomas Murray (Australian politician) (1885–1969), member of the New South Wales Legislative Council
Thomas Murray (Canadian politician) (1836–1915), former member of the Canadian House of Commons and Legislative Assembly of Ontario
Thomas B. Murray (1938–1998), Wisconsin State Assemblyman
Thomas Murray Jr. (1770–1823), United States representative from Pennsylvania
Tom J. Murray (1894–1971), U.S. representative from Tennessee
Thomas Patrick Murray (1880–1981), Ontario Legislative Assembly member from Renfrew South, 1929–1945
Thomas Templeton Murray (1891–1966), New Zealand politician

Sportspeople
 Tom Murray (American rower) (born 1969), American rower
Thomas Murray (curler) (1877–1944), Scottish curler
Tom Murray (New Zealand rower) (born 1994), New Zealand rower
Thomas Murray (soccer), American soccer player
Tommy Murray (ice hockey) (1893–1963), American ice hockey goalie
Thomas Murray (footballer) (1889–1976), English footballer
Tommy Murray (footballer, born January 1933), Scottish football outside right for Falkirk, Queen of the South, Leeds and Tranmere
Tommy Murray (footballer, born February 1933), Scottish football inside forward for Darlington, St. Johnstone, Alloa, Albion Rovers and Stranraer
Tommy Murray (footballer, born 1943), Scottish footballer

Other
Thomas Murray (writer) (1792–1872), Scottish printer and biographer
T. C. Murray (1873–1959), Irish dramatist
Thomas E. Murray (1860–1929), inventor and entrepreneur
Thomas Murray (organist) (born 1943), professor of organ at Yale University
Thomas Murray (artist) (1663–1734), portrait painter
Thomas Murray (provost of Eton) (1564–1623), Provost of Eton College
Thomas Murray (Medal of Honor), American Indian Wars soldier and Medal of Honor recipient
Thomas John Murray (born 1938), Canadian doctor and author
Thomas Murray (British Army officer, died 1764) (1698–1764), lieutenant-general in the British Army
Thomas Murray (British Army officer, died 1816) (1749–1816), Lieutenant-Governor of Portsmouth
==See also==
Tom Murray (disambiguation)